Gebara, is a small village and former municipality in the Basque Autonomous Community of Spain.

Gebara may also refer to:

Andrew Gebara, United States Air Force major general 
Ivone Gebara (born 1944), Brazilian Catholic nun, philosopher, and feminist theologian
Lotfi Jbara (born 1961), Tunisian footballer and football manager
Paulette Gebara Farah, 4-year-old Mexican victim of a suspicious death

See also
Jbara, a surname